The Assemblies of God in New Zealand is a Pentecostal denomination in New Zealand and a member of the World Assemblies of God Fellowship, the world's largest Pentecostal denomination. In 2007, the denomination had nearly 200 congregations and preaching points and 30,000 members and adherents, mostly in the North Island, and it sends missionaries to South Asia and Oceania. In 2016, the largest congregation was the Harbourside Church A/G in Takapuna, founded in the 1950s, with a weekly attendance of 1,500 people.

History
The Pentecostal movement in New Zealand started by the crusades of evangelist Smith Wigglesworth in 1922 and 1923, which led to the establishment of the Pentecostal Church of New Zealand. As the result of an internal dispute, 13 congregations and some pastors withdrew from the PCNZ and in March 1927 sent a cablegram to the General Council of the Assemblies of God of the United States asking for affiliation.

The 1930s were hard years for the Assemblies of God in New Zealand because of internal doctrinal disputes, the proselitism of the Apostolic Church, fragile relations with the PCNZ and economic distress generated by the 1929 Depression. However, frequent visits of preachers such as Aimee McPherson and A. C. Valdez helped to sustain the movement. During the 1960s, the Assemblies of God in New Zealand experienced regrowth and came to be the largest Pentecostal denomination in the country. In 1975, the AGNZ was one of the founders of the Associated Pentecostal Churches of New Zealand, which counts more than 700 congregations.

The 60th General Council, meeting at City West Church A/G in New Plymouth in 2011, saw the election of its first non-European General Superintendent in Samoan-born minister Iliafi Esera. This was also the first time the General Superintendency was held by a minister in a small New Zealand city (Wanganui). The 60th General Council also elected its first woman to the Executive Presbytery, Pastor Mina Acraman of Miracle Centre A/G, Hastings.

Leadership
Leaders of the AoG in New Zealand

From 1927 until 1944 the AoG leadership body was called the General Council (or the General Council Executive).  From then until 1997 it was called the Executive Council.  It was then renamed the Executive Presbytery.
Originally the leader of this body was simply referred to as Chairman.  In 1962 the title of the Leader of the Council was changed to General Superintendent.

National Conference 
The A/G New Zealand holds an annual National Conference that bi-annually includes a General Council meeting. Here is the recorded history of these national gatherings.

The 2020 and 2021 National Conferences were cancelled due to the global COVID-19 pandemic. These conferences were originally scheduled to be held at Church Unlimited in Auckland.

Notes

References
Assemblies of God in New Zealand website
 Associated Pentecostal Churches of New Zealand: Directory. 2005
Roberts, H,V, New Zealand's Greatest Revival under Smith Wigglesworth. 1951
Worsfold, James E. A History of the Charismatic Movements in New Zealand. 1974
Ian G. Clark Pentecost at the Ends of the Earth: The History of the Assemblies of God in New Zealand (1927-2003).

New Zealand
Pentecostalism in New Zealand
Pentecostal churches in New Zealand
Christian organizations established in 1927
Finished Work Pentecostals
Christian denominations in New Zealand
Pentecostal denominations in Oceania